Chris G. Miller (born June 15, 1954) is an American farmer and politician representing the 110th district in the Illinois House of Representatives. His district, in southeastern Illinois, includes all or parts of Coles, Clark, Crawford, Cumberland, Edgar, and Lawrence counties.

Early life and education 
Miller was born in Oakland, Illinois. He earned an associate degree from Lincoln Land Community College and a Bachelor of Science in education from Eureka College.

Career 
Miller is the owner of a large farm in northern Coles County. He is a Republican.

Miller is part of a group of Downstate Illinois Republicans who have pushed efforts to separate Chicago from the rest of the state, contending it has too much over the region's legislation and culture.

As of 2022, Miller is a member of the following Illinois House committees:

 Economic Opportunity & Equity Committee (HECO)
 Energy & Environment Committee (HENG)
 International Trade & Commerce Committee (HITC)

Trump rallies 
On January 6, 2021, Miller attended a Save America Rally before Trump supporters stormed the U.S. Capitol. In a video posted to his public Facebook page, Miller railed against "dangerous Democrat terrorists" and said "we’re in a great cultural war to see which worldview will survive."

During the 2021 storming of the United States Capitol, Miller's truck was in a restricted area next to the Capitol. It bore a decal of the logo of the extremist Three Percenters group, which later had five of its members charged with crimes associated with the attack, including trespass and assaulting police officers.

Censure 
On March 1, 2021, nearly three dozen members of the Illinois House of Representatives, including Speaker of the House Chris Welch, co-sponsored House Resolution 132 to "condemn" Miller's actions at the January 6 rally that preceded the riot at the U.S. Capitol. The resolution also references a complaint filed March 1 with the Illinois Legislative Inspector General to investigate Miller's actions on January 6.

On March 18, 2021, the Illinois House voted to censure Miller for attending the Save America rally that preceded Trump supporters' insurrection at the Capitol. The resolution by Illinois State Representative Bob Morgan alleged Miller's words and actions violated his oath of office and "created an environment that potentially threatens not only the sanctity of the Illinois General Assembly but also the safety of the members and their staff".

Personal life 
Miller is married to U.S. Rep. Mary Miller, elected in 2020 to represent Illinois's 15th Congressional District.

Electoral history

References

External links
 Profile at the Illinois General Assembly
 Campaign website

21st-century American politicians
Protesters in or near the January 6 United States Capitol attack
Eureka College alumni
Farmers from Illinois
Republican Party members of the Illinois House of Representatives
People from Oakland, Illinois
Living people
1954 births